Qızaýjan Seýilqojaulı (born February 1950) is a Chinese politician of Kazakh origin who served as vice chairman of the Xinjiang Regional Committee of the Chinese People's Political Consultative Conference from 2008 to 2013, governor of Ili Kazakh Autonomous Prefecture from 2003 to 2008, governor of Tacheng Prefecture from 1996 to 2003.

Biography
Qızaýjan Seýilqojaulı was born in Tekes County, Xinjiang, in February 1950. He joined the Communist Party of China (CPC) in August 1971, and entered the workforce in August 1972. In February 1978, he entered Minzu University of China, where he graduated in March 1979.

In March 1984, he was named acting magistrate of Tekes County and was installed in July. He was director of the Land Administration Bureau of Ili Kazakh Autonomous Prefecture in September 1989, and held that office until September 1993. In December 1996, he rose to become governor of Tacheng Prefecture, he remained in that position until January 2003, when he was transferred to Ili Kazakh Autonomous Prefecture again and appointed governor. He became vice chairman of the Xinjiang Regional Committee of the Chinese People's Political Consultative Conference in January 2008, and served until January 2013.

He was a delegate to the 9th and 10th National People's Congress.

References

1950 births
Living people
People from Tekes County
Minzu University of China alumni
Ili Kazakh Autonomous Prefecture governors
People's Republic of China politicians from Xinjiang
Chinese Communist Party politicians from Xinjiang
Delegates to the 9th National People's Congress
Delegates to the 10th National People's Congress